The 1973 Sam Houston State Bearkats football team represented Sam Houston State University as a member of the Lone Star Conference (LSC) during the 1973 NAIA Division I football season. Led by second-year head coach Allen Boren, the Bearkats compiled an overall record of 2–8 with a mark of 2–7 in conference play, and finished tied for eighth in the LSC.

Schedule

References

Sam Houston State
Sam Houston Bearkats football seasons
Sam Houston State Bearkats football